The Mathers table of Hebrew and "Chaldee" (Aramaic) letters is a tabular display of the pronunciation, appearance, numerical values, transliteration, names, and symbolism of the twenty-two letters of the Hebrew alphabet appearing in The Kabbalah Unveiled, S.L. MacGregor Mathers' late 19th century English translation of Kabbala Denudata, itself a Latin translation by Christian Knorr von Rosenroth of the Zohar, a primary Kabbalistic text.

This table has been used as a primary reference for a basic understanding of the Hebrew alphabet as it applies to the Kabbalah, generally outside of traditional Jewish mysticism, by many modern Hermeticists and students of the occult, including members of the Hermetic Order of the Golden Dawn and other magical organizations deriving from it. It has been reproduced and adapted in many books published from the early 20th century to the present.

See also
 Gematria
 Hebrew language
 Kabbalah
 Mysticism
 Notaricon

References 

Books that reproduce the Mathers table either substantially or exactly:

External links 
The Kabbalah Unveiled at www.sacred-texts.com

Hebrew alphabet
Hermetic Qabalah
Numerology